Wujihoushizhudi, born Ba, was the son of Huxie Shizhu Houti. He succeeded his brother Wanshishizhudi in 124 AD and ruled until 128 AD. He was succeeded by his brother Xiuli.

At the time of Wuji's accession, the northern borders were troubled by Xianbei raids and one of his senior officers was killed in the fighting. Wuji received assistance from the Han dynasty in fending off the Xianbei, with his reign being marked by growing dependence on the Han. Southern Xiongnu once guarded the Chinese frontier, but now they were the ones who required aid.

Wuji died in 128 AD and was succeeded by his brother Xiuli.

Footnotes

References

Bichurin N.Ya., "Collection of information on peoples in Central Asia in ancient times", vol. 1, Sankt Petersburg, 1851, reprint Moscow-Leningrad, 1950

Taskin B.S., "Materials on Sünnu history", Science, Moscow, 1968, p. 31 (In Russian)

Chanyus